Nong Don railway station is a railway station located in Nong Don Subdistrict, Nong Don District, Saraburi.

Train services 
 Rapid No. 111/112 Bangkok- Den Chai- Bangkok
 Ordinary No. 201/202 Bangkok- Phitsanulok- Bangkok
 Ordinary No. 207/208 Bangkok- Nakhon Sawan- Bangkok
 Ordinary No. 209/210 Bangkok- Ban Takhli- Bangkok
 Ordinary No. 211/212 Bangkok- Taphan Hin- Bangkok
 Commuter No. 301/302 Bangkok- Lop Buri- Bangkok (weekends only)
 Commuter No. 303/304 Bangkok- Lop Buri- Bangkok (weekdays only)
 Commuter No. 315/316 Bangkok- Lop Buri- Bangkok (weekdays only)
 Commuter No. 317/318 Bangkok- Lop Buri- Bangkok (weekdays only)
 Local No.409 Ayutthaya- Lop Buri

References 
 
 

Railway stations in Thailand